Sporting Clube de Portugal has a professional futsal team based in Lisbon, Portugal, since 4 March 1985, and plays in Portuguese Futsal First Division. They are the most decorated team in terms of domestic titles in the country, and are two time winners of UEFA Futsal Champions League, with their second title in four years. With the 2019-20 season cancelled due to Covid-19 pandemic and since the 2009-10 season, Sporting have made the last 12 Portuguese National Futsal finals and winning 9, with the club winning 3 straight Portuguese championships 2016, 2017 & 2018, making it their second three peat in their history.

History
Futsal was introduced in Sporting Clube de Portugal in 1985. As a founding member of the first Portuguese League Championship in 1991, Sporting won the league for its first success.

In 1995, Sporting fans were forced to choose the modalities to keep in the club, due to financial problems, having chosen handball and futsal, leading to the closure of the basketball, hockey and volleyball sections (which have all returned in the meantime).

In 2002, futsal is officially adopted by UEFA and the UEFA Futsal Cup was created. This first edition was played in Lisbon and organized by Sporting Clube de Portugal, which represented the country as national champion and reached the semi-finals. The 2014-15 edition was also held in Lisbon with Sporting CP once again reaching the final four.

In 2019, Sporting CP won their first UEFA Futsal Champions League after defeating tournament hosts Kairat Almaty by 2-1. In 2021, Sporting CP won their second Futsal Champions League title defeating FC Barcelona 4-3 in Zadar, Croatia. In the 2020-21 season Sporting won its 16th Portuguese First Division Title, beating their eternal rivals Benfica 3-1 at Pavilhão Fidelidade, thus completing the quadruple for the calendar season (minus the Portuguese Cup: cancelled due to Covid-19) and extending Sportings' hegemony in Portuguese futsal.

Domestically and Internationally Sporting is currently the most decorated team in Portugal, with a total of 43 trophies: 17 Portuguese League titles, 9 Portuguese Cups, 4 League Cups, 11 Super Cups and 2 UEFA Futsal Champions League. Overall, Sporting holds the record of all five major competitions listed then any other Portuguese Futsal team and are seen as the greatest team of the modern era.

Facilities

Pavilhão João Rocha
Pavilhão João Rocha is a multi-sports pavilion located in the parish of Lumiar, in Lisbon. Located next to the Estádio José Alvalade, it is the home of Sporting CP sports. In honor of one of the most distinguished figures in the history of Sporting, the pavilion was named after former club president, João Rocha, who remained in office from September 1973 to October 1986. Its inauguration took place on the day June 21, 2017.

Honours

International competitions
UEFA Futsal Champions League: 2
 Champions: 2018–19, 2020–21

National competitions
 Portuguese League: 17
 1990–91, 1992–93, 1993–94, 1994–95, 1998–99, 2000–01, 2003–04, 2005–06, 2009–10, 2010–11, 2012–13, 2013–14, 2015–16, 2016–17, 2017–18, 2020–21, 2021-22
 Portuguese Cup: 9
 2005–06, 2007–08, 2010–11, 2012–13, 2015–16, 2017–18, 2018–19, 2019–20, 2021-22
 Portuguese League Cup: 4
 2015–16, 2016–17, 2020–21, 2021–22
 Portuguese Supercup: 11
 2001, 2004, 2008, 2010, 2013, 2014, 2017, 2018, 2019, 2021, 2022

Current squad

References

External links
Sporting Official Website
Sporting in zerozero.pt

Futsal clubs in Portugal
Sporting CP sports
1988 establishments in Portugal